Alberto Senigagliesi (born 12 August 1970) is an Italian former alpine skier who competed in the 1992 Winter Olympics.

References

External links
 

1970 births
Living people
Italian male alpine skiers
Olympic alpine skiers of Italy
Alpine skiers at the 1992 Winter Olympics
People from Susa, Piedmont
Sportspeople from the Metropolitan City of Turin
Italian alpine skiing coaches